Incommunicado, from the Spanish incomunicado, means "cut off from contact", "impossible to reach".

It may also refer to:
Incommunicado, an album by Alex Smoke
"Incommunicado" (song), a 1987 single by Marillion
Solitary confinement, one of the ways in which a person can be held incommunicado
Incommunicado detention, see enforced disappearance